Daniel Chacón is a Chicano short story writer, novelist, essayist, editor, professor, and radio host based in El Paso, Texas. He chairs the University of Texas, El Paso's creative writing graduate program, the country's only bilingual MFA program. He founded the Chicano Writers and Artists Association with Fresno State classmate and close friend Andrés Montoya in 1985.

Early life
Chacón was born and raised in Fresno, California; his father was from El Paso, Texas. One of his brothers is writer Kenneth Robert Chacón, from whom he was estranged for many years. He earned a BA in Political Science from California State University, Fresno and an MFA in Fiction Writing from the University of Oregon. While at CSU, he wrote for the campus newspaper La Voz de Aztan.

Career
Chacón joined the MFA program at University of Texas El Paso as an assistant professor in Creative Writing in 2000 and has been the department chair since 2017. Since 2011, he has co-hosted the KTEP show Words on a Wire; his original co-host was Benjamin Alire Sáenz and is now Tim Z. Hernandez. Guests include Alison Hawthorne Deming, Francisco Aragón, and Garrett Hongo. He serves at the assistant director of the Alisa Ann Ruch Burn Foundation and was appointed chair for the International Association of Burn Camps' Board of Directors in 2018, and is part of the Southwest Festival of the Written Word's advisory board.

He has also edited several books, including A Jury of Trees (a posthumous collection of poetry by Andrés Montoya) (2017), The Last Supper of Chicano Heroes: The Selected Work of José Antonio Burciaga (2008; with Mimi Reisel Gladstein) and Colón-ization: The Posthumous Poems of Andrés Montoya (2017). His writing has also appeared in several anthologies: Caliente: The Best Erotic Writing in Latin American Fiction (2002), Lengua Fresca: Latinos Writing on the Edge (2006), and Best of the West 2009: New Stories from the West Side of the Missouri (2009), among others. Journals that have published his work include ZYZZYVA, Americas Review, Bilingual Review, Colorado Review, New England Review, and Callaloo. He also dabbles in playwrighting, standup, and poetry.

Personal life
Chacón is married and has a step-daughter. His first child was born in 2020. He began speaking Spanish in 1996.

Awards and honors
Chacón has received a grant from the Christopher Isherwood Foundation and was inducted into the Texas Institute of Letters in 2019.

Selected works

References

External links
 UTEP faculty page
 Words on a Wire page
 Online video of show UTEP Prospector

21st-century American novelists
American radio personalities
California State University, Fresno alumni
Hispanic and Latino American novelists
Hispanic and Latino American writers
Living people
University of Oregon alumni
University of Texas at El Paso faculty
Writers from California
1962 births
21st-century American poets
American male novelists
American male poets
American Book Award winners
21st-century American male writers
Novelists from Texas
American writers of Mexican descent
American academics of Mexican descent
Chicano
Writers from Fresno, California
People from Fresno, California
People from El Paso, Texas
Writers from El Paso, Texas